Aethiocarenus is an extinct genus of insects which has a single species Aethiocarenus burmanicus described from a 98.79 ±0.62 million year old fossil found in Burmese amber from the Hukawng Valley of Myanmar. The insect is unusual due to the vertex of the triangular head being attached to the pronotum as opposed to the hypotenuse. When first described Aethiocarenus was placed as the sole member of the family  Aethiocarenidae and order Aethiocarenodea. However, Aethiocarenus was later considered to be a nymph of Alienopterus. Vršanský et al. (2018) considered Aethiocarenus to be an alienopterid nymph, but considered it distinct from other members of this group and deserving a separate genus rank.

Description
Aethiocarenus was probably an omnivore and had a long, narrow, flat body, and long slender legs. The eyes are at the sides of the head, allowing the insect to look behind.  Glands on the neck indicate that the creature may have emitted chemicals to repel predators.

References

Late Cretaceous insects
Fossil taxa described in 2017
Burmese amber
Fossils of Myanmar
Cretaceous insects of Asia
Dictyoptera